Vasiliy Vladimirovich Khripin (February 26, 1893  – July 29, 1938), was a Soviet Air Force General. He fought in the Imperial Russian military in World War I before going over to the Bolsheviks during the subsequent Civil War. He was a recipient of the Order of the Red Banner and the Order of the Red Star. 

During the Great Purge, he was arrested on November 26, 1937 and executed the following year at Kommunarka.

Lieutenant General Khripin was not mentioned again in the Soviet press until almost 25 years later, when the Soviet Defense Ministry newspaper Krasnaya Zvesda ran an article on February 26, 1963, commemorating the 70th anniversary of General Khripin's birth.  Retired Air Force General Alexander V. Belyakov wrote the feature and praised Khripin as an innovator in Soviet aviation.

Bibliography
 Цыкин А. Д. От «Ильи Муромца» до ракетоносца — Краткий очерк истории Дальней Авиации. — Moscow: Военное издательство МО, 1975. — C. 45.
 Беляков А. В. В полет сквозь годы. — Воениздат, 1981.
 Дуэ Д. Господство в воздухе: Сборник трудов по вопросам воздушной войны. — Moscow: Государственное военное издательство Наркомата обороны Союза ССР, 1936. — С. 14.
 Авиация: Энциклопедия / Главный редактор Г. П. Свищев. — Moscow: Большая Российская Энциклопедия, 1994.

References

1893 births
1938 deaths
Russian military personnel of World War I
People of the Russian Civil War
Soviet komkors
Recipients of the Order of the Red Banner
Great Purge victims from Russia
People executed by the Soviet Union